Kangdong Residence  is the summer retreat and second major residence of the North Korean leader Kim Jong-un besides Ryongsong Residence.

Location
Taedong River is just  to the north. According to Kim Jong-il’s former bodyguard Lee Young-kuk there are at least eight North Korean leader’s residences outside Pyongyang.

Description
The compound was constructed in the 1980s and expanded in the 1990s under the order of Kim Jong-il. It contains buildings for Kim Jong-il, his late wife Ko Yong-hui, his sister Kim Kyong-hui and his brother-in-law Jang Sung-taek.
The area is mostly used as a summer residence, to spend holidays or for parties with close officials. The estate has an elaborate garden, set around many lakes. There are numerous guest houses, and a banqueting hall. The whole compound is a maximum security area, surrounded by two armored fence lines with guards huts and checkpoints, clearly visible on satellite pictures. Kim Jong-il’s former cook Kenji Fujimoto worked and lived in a guest house within the compound and provided some photographs dated 1989. Analysis of satellite pictures showed that the area changed significantly since then and even after 2006 new buildings and a new railway station were established. Defectors reported that in Hyangmok-ri, not far from the residence and from the Mausoleum of Tangun, Kim Jong-un’s birthplace is being built, though he was actually born in Changsong, North Pyongan Province.

Facilities
 Furnished entertainment facilities with bowling, shooting and roller-skating
 Horse stables and a racing track
 Football field

See also

 North Korean leader's residences
 Official residence
 Ryongsong Residence
 Sinuiju North Korean Leader's Residence
 North Korea Uncovered

References

External links
  – Project for comprehensive mapping of North Korea
  – Detailed satellite pictures of six North Korean leader’s residences

Buildings and structures in Pyongyang
Official residences
Kim Jong-il
1980s establishments in North Korea